Miss Belarus is a national beauty pageant in Belarus, established in 1998.

History
The Miss Belarus beauty pageant was established in 1998. Olga Serejnikova has been the director since 2003. Miss Belarus is traditionally held once every two years. The winner is expected to become a national ambassador for the country.

Although the country has never competed in Miss Universe, Belarus has been represented at the other three of the Big Four international beauty pageants: Miss World, Miss International and Miss Earth. Miss Belarus has also sent its winner to the Miss Europe and Miss Supranational competitions.

From 2021, winners of the Miss Belarus organization were sent to Miss Universe, Miss World, Miss International and Miss Supranational. Miss Earth Belarus is selected through a separate event in Belarus.

Prize
The Miss Belarus crown, made of white gold, contains half a thousand of cubic zirconia and topazes and weighs 120 grams. The winner also receives special prizes, including a BelGee offroader.

International winners
Winners of Miss Belarus who won International pageants:
 Miss Supranational 2012 ― Katsiaryna Buraya

Titleholders

References

Belarusian awards
Belarus
Beauty pageants in Belarus
Recurring events established in 1998
1998 establishments in Belarus
Belarus
Belarus
Belarus